In propositional logic, tautology is either of two commonly used rules of replacement. The rules are used to eliminate redundancy in disjunctions and conjunctions when they occur in logical proofs. They are:

The principle of idempotency of disjunction:

 

and the principle of idempotency of conjunction:
 

Where "" is a metalogical symbol representing "can be replaced in a logical proof with."

Formal notation 

Theorems are those logical formulas  where  is the conclusion of a valid proof, while the equivalent semantic consequence  indicates a tautology.

The tautology rule may be expressed as a sequent:

 

and

 

or as a rule of inference:

and

where the rule is that wherever an instance of "" or "" appears on a line of a proof, it can be replaced with "";

or as the statement of a truth-functional tautology or theorem of propositional logic. The principle was stated as a theorem of propositional logic by Russell and Whitehead in  Principia Mathematica as:

and

 

where  is a proposition expressed in some formal system.

References

Rules of inference
Theorems in propositional logic